Benjamin Chiles (June 22, 1825 – March 20, 1911) was a state legislator in Mississippi. He represented Oktibbeha County from 1874 to 1878.

He was born a slave in South Carolina and relocated to Mississippi in 1837, with John M. Chiles.

See also
 African-American officeholders during and following the Reconstruction era

References

1825 births
People from Oktibbeha County, Mississippi
African-American state legislators in Mississippi
African-American politicians during the Reconstruction Era
American freedmen
1911 deaths